Dmitri Dun (born 7 November 1989) is a Ukrainian former competitive ice dancer. With Siobhan Heekin-Canedy, he is a three-time Ukrainian national champion and placed as high as 14th at the World Championships.

Career 
Early in his career, Dun competed with Alisa Agafonova. They made their ISU Junior Grand Prix debut in the 2004–05 season. In 2006, they won their first JGP medal, silver, in Taipei. In 2007–08, Agafonova/Dun placed 4th in one JGP event and took silver in another. They qualified for the ISU Junior Grand Prix Final where they finished 6th. They then placed 7th at the 2008 World Junior Championships.

In 2008–09, Agafonova/Dun won gold and silver medals on the JGP series. They qualified for their second JGP Final and finished 7th. They won the 2009 Ukrainian national junior title and were sent to the 2009 World Junior Championships where they finished 13th. The following season, the duo obtained their fifth JGP medal, bronze. They parted ways at the end of the season.

In mid-2011, Dun teamed up with Siobhan Heekin-Canedy. In their first season together, they won the Ukrainian national title and placed 15th at both the 2012 European Championships and 2012 World Championships.

In the 2012–13 season, Heekin-Canedy and Dun finished 12th at the 2013 European Championships and 14th at the 2013 World Championships. Their Worlds placement gave Ukraine a spot in the ice dancing event at the 2014 Winter Olympic.

Dun retired from competition on March 31, 2014 and moved with his wife to Chicago, Illinois. 

In 2015 Dmitri moved to West Palm Beach, Florida, and he is Ice dance coach in Palm Beach Skate Zone, Lake worth, FL.

Dun entered the show skating world and is currently the pair team with partner Mickayla Lindberg at Busch Gardens in Tampa FL.

Programs

With Heekin-Canedy

With Agafonova

Competitive highlights

With Heekin-Canedy

With Agafonova

References

External links 

 
 
 Agafonova/ Dun at Tracings

Ukrainian male ice dancers
1989 births
Living people
Sportspeople from Kharkiv
Figure skaters at the 2014 Winter Olympics
Olympic figure skaters of Ukraine
Competitors at the 2013 Winter Universiade